Purav Raja and Divij Sharan were the defending champions but chose not to defend their title.

Adrián Menéndez-Maceiras and Sergiy Stakhovsky won the title after defeating Roberto Ortega Olmedo and David Vega Hernández 4–6, 6–3, [10–7] in the final.

Seeds

Draw

References
 Main Draw

Open Castilla y León - Men's Doubles
2017 Men's Doubles
2017 Open Castilla y León